Andy Kirby (November 30, 1961 – July 18, 2002) was an American former stock car racing driver, most notably in NASCAR. Kirby did not initially begin with NASCAR, where his career would end. Instead, Kirby quickly earned his reputation as a motorcycle racer in the Southeastern United States. Kirby would eventually become friends with NASCAR Busch Series driver Chad Chaffin, who in turn would assist Kirby in furthering his career.

Rise to National Fame
Kirby turned heads by winning three track championships (1994, 1996, and 1997) at the highly competitive Nashville Speedway USA. He raced weekly against Chaffin (the 1993 and 1995 champion).

Busch Series career 
Owner Larry Lockamy offered Kirby a ride in his #28 Williams Travel Centers Chevy for some 1999 events. Kirby made his debut in February at Rockingham. He qualified in the 38th position, completed 157 laps, and then wrecked. He finished 31st. The next race, Las Vegas, looked better for Kirby, as he qualified in 5th place for his second career start. However, the good feeling did not last long. He wrecked and finished 42nd. He was 33rd at his home track Nashville, 36th at Loudon and 26th at Dover Downs. His best finish came at Bristol. After starting 34th, Andy came home in 20th. However, due to his recklessness and lack of funding, the Lockamy team released Kirby.

However, Williams Travel was still intrigued by Kirby, and they got him a five-race deal in 2000 with the #39 Williams Chevy. He beat his Bristol finish with a 19th at Talladega. However, the rest of the season was not the best. 28th (at IRP), 33rd (at Bristol), 38th (at Memphis), and one DNQ (Did Not Qualify) made the rest of the season a disappointment.

In 2001, Andy mainly stayed at home but he had several offers during the season and got some seat time. He drove two races for Jay Robinson Racing. He once again got a career-best of 16th at Talladega and finished 33rd at Darlington. He ran three races for Moy Racing. He drove the #77 Ford to a 30th at Michigan International Speedway, 41st at Kansas, and 32nd at Homestead-Miami. He ran one race in the #52 Means Racing Ford. He finished 41st at Memphis.

Kirby ran well enough in 2001 to be asked back to those teams in 2002. He ran the first five races for Moy, finished 28th at Las Vegas as the best among those five. Jay Robinson asked him to come for 4 races. Andy received his best career finish at Talladega once again. After avoiding a big wreck, Andy was able to come home in 6th position, his first and only top-10. In the other three races, he finished 23rd, 29th, and 32nd. Kirby ran two races for Fred Bickford. He finished 39th and 41st in those races. Kirby's final start came at Kentucky Speedway, where he finished 23rd.

Death 
Kirby was getting ready to make a start at Pikes Peak. However, he was killed in a motorcycle accident in his hometown White House, Tennessee, on July 18, 2002. Many teams ran decals on their cars honoring Kirby following his death.

External links

References 

1961 births
2002 deaths
Motorcycle road incident deaths
NASCAR drivers
People from White House, Tennessee
Racing drivers from Tennessee
Road incident deaths in Tennessee